This is the list of badminton players who will be participating at the 2020 Summer Olympics in Tokyo, Japan from 24 July to 2 August.

References

External links 
 https://bwf.tournamentsoftware.com/ranking/ranking.aspx?rid=248

2020 Summer Olympics
Badminton at the 2020 Summer Olympics
Badminton